The 1971–72 Georgetown Hoyas men's basketball team represented Georgetown University during the 1971–72 NCAA University Division college basketball season. John Magee coached them in his sixth and final season as head coach. The team was an independent and played its home games at McDonough Gymnasium on the Georgetown campus in Washington, D.C. It finished the season with a record of 3-23 and therefore was not ranked in the Top 20 in the Associated Press Poll or Coaches' Poll at any time and had no post-season play.

Season recap

Forward Art White, thought at the time to have been the greatest player in Georgetown history, had left the team at the end of the previous season because of academic difficulties, and he sat out this season entirely. Magees relationship with his players had begun to unravel the previous year, when the 1970-71 team had followed up the 1969-70 team's appearance in the 1970 National Invitation Tournament with a disappointing performance that Magee blamed on the players – including the once highly regarded White – although he reserved praise for then-junior forward Mike Laughna. In all, Georgetown lost all but two of its top nine scorers from the 1970-71 season.

Magees relationship with his players continued to deteriorate this year, but that and the loss of scorers were not the 1971-72 squads only problems. Athletic director Robert Sigholtz had committed the Hoyas to a schedule that included only 10 home games and forced the team to play nine straight road games between December 13, 1971, and January 22, 1972. Magee, working in the last year of his contract with no sign of the university offering an extension, openly feuded with Sigholtz over this schedule and over whether or not Sigholz had provided Magee with an adequate recruiting budget, which totaled only $5,140. After Laughna, now a senior and the teams captain, said in an interview with The Washington Post that Georgetown did not seem to spend very much of the revenue it earned from the basketball team on the basketball program itself, Sigholtz responded with an ineffective late-season news conference that failed to address Laughnas comments and deflected criticism onto Magee, blaming him for the unfavorable schedule and for not using fully the recruiting tools he had available to him. Observers took away little more than the impression that the Georgetown athletic department was deeply troubled.

Under these difficult circumstances, Mike Laughna put in a creditable performance on the court during the otherwise dismal season, with 25 points and 11 rebounds at Texas, 22 points and 12 rebounds three days later at San Francisco, and 24 points and 15 rebounds against George Washington, He passed Jim Barry as the top scorer in Georgetown history on March 4, 1972, during a loss at Boston College in the final game of the season and of his collegiate career, and finished with 1,234 career points. Despite his efforts, the team won only one game each in December, January, and February.

The 1971-72 team's .115 winning percentage was the worst in Georgetown men's basketball history and well below the previous worst of .238 set by the 5-16 team of 1930-31. Magee resigned two weeks after Sigholtzs news conference after a six-year tenure as head coach which saw two winning seasons and one post-season tournament appearance. Sigholtz resigned nine days after Magee.

Although it was not known at the time, the 1971-72 season brought a 25-year stretch of mostly undistinguished basketball at Georgetown to an end. Although the team had appeared in the National Invitation Tournament in 1953 and 1970, between the 1947-48 season and the end of this season, Georgetown had posted an overall record under .500 and its total of 296 wins during those 25 seasons was the lowest among the 32 Catholic universities playing Division I college basketball in the United States. The team also had had no NCAA tournament appearances since 1943. The arrival of John Thompson, Jr., as head coach the following season, however, would begin Georgetowns rise to the status of national basketball power.

Roster
Source

1971–72 schedule and results

Sources

|-
!colspan=9 style="background:#002147; color:#8D817B;"| Regular Season

References

Georgetown Hoyas men's basketball seasons
Georgetown
Georgetown Hoyas men's basketball team
Georgetown Hoyas men's basketball team